Jutta Paulus (née Wege, born 9 May 1967) is a German pharmacist and politician who has been serving as a Member of the European Parliament for Alliance 90/The Greens since 2019.

Early life and education
Paulus graduated from Herderschule Gießen in 1986. She completed her pharmacy studies at the University of Marburg in 1990 and moved to Neustadt an der Weinstraße. She began practising as a pharmacist in 1991.

Political career
Paulus joined the Green Party in 1987. Following the 2016 state elections in Rhineland-Palatinate, she was part of her party's delegation in the negotiations on a coalition government under Minister-President Malu Dreyer. From 2017 until 2019, she co-chaired the Green Party in Rhineland-Palatinate, alongside Josef Winkler.

Paulus became a Member of the European Parliament in the 2019 elections. She has since been serving on the Committee on the Environment, Public Health and Food Safety. In this capacity, she is the Parliament's rapporteur on CO2 emissions in the maritime sector. In 2022, she also joined the Special Committee on the COVID-19 pandemic.  

In addition to her committee assignments, Paulus is part of the Parliament's delegation for relations with Japan. She is also a member of the European Parliament Intergroup on Anti-Corruption and the European Parliament Intergroup on Climate Change, Biodiversity and Sustainable Development. 

In the negotiations to form a so-called traffic light coalition of the Social Democratic Party (SPD), the Green Party and the Free Democratic Party (FDP) following the 2021 German elections, Paulus was part of her party's delegation in the working group on environmental policy, co-chaired by Rita Schwarzelühr-Sutter, Steffi Lemke and Stefan Birkner.

Other activities
 German Industry Initiative for Energy Efficiency (DENEFF), Member of the Parliamentary Advisory Board
 Amnesty International, Member

Political positions
In May 2021, Paulus joined a group of 39 mostly Green Party lawmakers from the European Parliament who in a letter urged the leaders of Germany, France and Italy not to support Arctic LNG 2, a $21 billion Russian Arctic liquefied natural gas (LNG) project, due to climate change concerns.

References

External links

Living people
MEPs for Germany 2019–2024
21st-century women MEPs for Germany
Alliance 90/The Greens MEPs
1967 births